Coleophora littorella is a moth of the family Coleophoridae. It is found in Canada, including New Brunswick.

The larvae feed on the seeds of Salicornia species. They create a trivalved, tubular silken case.

References

littorella
Moths described in 1940
Moths of North America